Carlo Mauricio Alban  (born October 3, 1979) is an Ecuadorian actor, best known as "Carlo" from Sesame Street (1993–98). He played the role of Luis "McGrady" Gallego on Prison Break (2007–08). He has since gone on to perform in a variety of mediums, including plays and television shows.

Early life 
Alban arrived in the U.S. at the age of 7 with his family on a travel visa.  However, his family intended to stay in the United States despite the potential consequences, living on an expired visa with the risk of deportation always prevalent. When he was 12 he got his first role in Oliver! as the title character. He then went on to other roles in New York until he was cast on Sesame Street.

Raised in Sayreville, New Jersey, Alban graduated from Sayreville War Memorial High School in 1996; he was inducted into the school's hall of fame in 2019. He attended Rutgers University, majoring in visual arts.

Sesame Street
Alban was on Sesame Street from 1993 to 1998 and during that time his being in the U.S. was against the law.  In response to the reasoning for him being on Sesame Street while lacking proper documentation, he said, "what better place to hide than in the spotlight where no one would suspect you?" During these teenage years Alban had several formative experiences that he later talked about in his play Intringulus, including an instance where upon learning the situation of his immigration, a friend tells him to "get out of my country". This experience was among a collection of similar encounters where Alban experienced a 'snag', the name of his one-man show.

Career

Television 
He has had recurring roles in Strangers with Candy, Thicker Than Blood, and The Tavern. He has guest starred on Law & Order, The Jury, Touched by an Angel,  the HBO prison-themed series Oz, Deadline, Law & Order: Criminal Intent and in Prison Break as Luis "McGrady" Gallego. He played "Birdman" in the film Whip It.

Stage 
Alban has made appearances on the stage, including multiple Off-Broadway shows and an appearance in Sweat on Broadway

Regional Theatre Productions:

New York Productions:

Awards 
For television, Alban has been nominated for two Young Artist Awards for his work in Touched by an Angel and Thicker Than Blood. He also received a nomination for an ALMA award for his work in Thicker Than Blood, and Thicker Than Blood received an ALMA award for Outstanding Made-For-Television Movie or Mini-Series. He has also received the New Dramatists' Charles Bowden Award.

Sweat 
Alban starred inSweat, the Pulitzer Prize Winner for Drama 2017. Sweat ran on Broadway through June 2017 and tackles the issues that a group of friends and coworkers must deal with as their jobs are threatened.

References

External links 
 

1979 births
Living people
Ecuadorian male film actors
Ecuadorian male television actors
Ecuadorian emigrants to the United States
People from Sayreville, New Jersey
Place of birth missing (living people)
20th-century Ecuadorian male actors
Rutgers University alumni
Sayreville War Memorial High School alumni
Theatre World Award winners
Undocumented immigrants to the United States